Gone Country may refer to the following:
"Gone Country" (song), a 1994 song by Alan Jackson
Gone Country (TV series), a television series on Country Music Television